Promise is the debut album from the Liverpool indie rock band The Maybes?. The album is released 15 September 2008. The album was recorded at Monnow Valley Studios in Monmouth, Wales in three sessions from late 2007 to early 2008 and it has been licensed to Xtra Mile Recordings.

Track listing
All tracks written by Nick Ellis (unless stated):
"Turn Me Over"
"Boys"
"Modern Love"
"Trick of the Light" (Dominic Allen, Nick Ellis, Nick Otaegui, Lee Smith, Timo Tierney)
"The Comearound"
"Ronnie Loves Julie" (Smith)
"Summertime"
"Full Moon Adagio" (Allen, Ellis, Otaegui, Smith, Tierney)
"Disappear" (Allen, Ellis, Tierney)
"Healing Hands" (Ellis, Smith)
"Talk About You"
"Promise" (Smith, Tierney)

Personnel
Produced and mixed by Head
Engineered by Jim Anderson
Recorded at Monnow Valley Studios
Mastered by John Dent
Photography by Christian Petersen
Design by Lisa Robson
Xtra Mile Recordings
Universal Publishing

References

External links
Xtra Mile Recordings

2008 albums